Conway, the Kerry Dancer is a 1912 American silent documentary produced by Kalem Company. It was directed by Sidney Olcott.

Production notes
The film was shot in county Kerry, Ireland, during summer of 1912.

References
 Michel Derrien, Aux origines du cinéma irlandais: Sidney Olcott, le premier oeil, TIR 2013.

External links
 
  Conway, the Kerry Dancer website dedicated to Sidney Olcott

1912 films
American silent short films
American black-and-white films
Films set in Ireland
Films shot in Ireland
Films directed by Sidney Olcott
American documentary films
1912 documentary films
Black-and-white documentary films
1910s American films